Kanevskaya is a stanitsa and the administrative center of Kanevskoy District of Krasnodar Krai, Russia.

History 
Kanevskaya was founded in 1794 among the first forty settlements of the Black Sea Cossacks in the Kuban. The name was transferred from the kuren of the Zaporizhzhya Sich.

Population 
Population: 44,755 (2002); 45,334 (2020);  

It is the largest village in Russia and Eastern Europe.

References

Rural localities in Krasnodar Krai
Kanevskoy District
Kuban Oblast